Jennifer Gordon founded the Workplace Project in 1992, a non-profit worker center in Hempstead, New York, which organizes immigrant workers, mostly from Central and South America.  The Workplace Project lobbied for and won a strong wage enforcement law in New York state.  Gordon was the executive director of the Workplace Project from 1993 to 1998. Gordon was a MacArthur Fellow from 1999 to 2004.  She is the author of Suburban Sweatshops: The Fight for Immigrant Rights, as well as several articles on immigrants, politics, and labor unions.  She received a Bachelor of Arts degree from Radcliffe College of Harvard University in 1987 and a Juris Doctor degree from Harvard Law School in 1992.  She is currently an associate professor at Fordham University School of Law, where she teaches courses on immigration and labor law .

Bibliography
 "We Make the Road by Walking: Immigrant Workers and the Struggle for Social Change," Harvard Civil Rights - Civil Liberties Law Review. Vol 30, pg. 407. 1995.
 "Immigrants Fight the Power - Workers Centers are One Path to Labor Organizing and Political Participation," The Nation. January 3, 2000.
"American Sweatshops: Organizing workers in the Global Economy." Boston Review. Summer 2005. 
 "Law, Lawyers and Labor: The United Farm Workers’ Legal Strategy in the 1960s and 1970s and the Role of Law in Union Organizing Today." Pennsylvania Journal of Labor & Employment Law. Vol. 8, Pg 1. 2005.
Suburban Sweatshops: The Fight for Immigrant Rights. Belknap/Harvard University Press. 2005. .
"Transnational Labor Citizenship." Southern California Law Review. Vol. 80, pg 503. 2007. 
"Citizenship Talk: Bridging the Gap Between Race and Immigration Scholarship." (with R.A. Lenhardt). Fordham Law Review. Vol 75. pg 2493. 2007.

References

External links
 Fordham Law faculty bio

Year of birth missing (living people)
Living people
MacArthur Fellows
People from Hempstead (village), New York
Fordham University faculty
Radcliffe College alumni
Harvard Law School alumni
Labour law scholars